The 2014–15 season is the fourth season of the SEHA League and 10 teams from Bosnia and Herzegovina, Croatia, Macedonia, Hungary, Slovakia, Serbia and Belarus.

Team information

Venues and locations

Regular season

Standings

Results 
In the table below the home teams are listed on the left and the away teams along the top.

Final six

Quarterfinals

Semifinals

Match for third place

Final

References 
 SEHA Bulletin No. 18
 SEHA Bulletin No. 19

External links 
 

SEHA League
2014–15 domestic handball leagues